Kalbarri is a coastal town in the Mid West region located  north of Perth, Western Australia. It is connected by public transport to Perth via Transwa coach services N1 and N2.

History 
Nanda people have been awarded exclusive native title rights over several key areas including Paradise Flats, Bully, Wilgie Mia, Mooliabatanya and Syphon pools.

The story of the Beemarra serpent is the central dreaming story of Nanda people. The Beemarra is, according to Nanda culture, an ancestral being responsible for the creation of the land and waters in the region

Kalbarri was named after an Aboriginal man from the Nanda tribe and is also the name of an edible seed.

The cliffs near the river mouth were named after a trading ship, the Zuytdorp, that was wrecked there in 1712.

The area became a popular fishing and tourist spot in the 1940s and by 1948 the state government declared a townsite. Lots were soon surveyed and the town was gazetted in 1951.

In April 2021 the town suffered serious damage from Tropical Cyclone Seroja.

Tourism 
The town is geared towards tourism and fishing, with attractions including the daily pelican feeding, the Kalbarri National Park, Murchison River Gorge and the Murchison River. There are two charter boats to go on to view the Murchison River. The town attracts 200,000 tourists every year, with the population of the town swelling to 8,000 during holiday seasons. Electricity to the town and hotels is supplied by a fragile 33kV power line from the central grid. To increase grid stability, a 5MW/2MWh grid battery is installed.

The Kalbarri National Park is home to a phenomenon of geography and geology known as the Z Bend, a tourist lookout, and "Nature's Window", a rock formation overlooking hundreds of kilometres of Murchison River. The Rainbow Jungle (The Australian Parrot Breeding Centre), located a few kilometres south of the town centre, features hundreds of exotic species of birds in their native habitat plus a walk-in cage allowing humans to interact with the birds. Red Bluff and other coastal cliffs and formations are located south of the town.

Climate
Kalbarri lies in the warm-summer Mediterranean climate zone (Köppen: Csa), bordering the more tropical semi-arid climate (BSh) zone. Winters are mild with warm days and occasional heavy precipitation, while summers are hot and dry with the occasional storm or more rarely a decaying tropical cyclone. On 11 April 2021 the town was struck by Category 3 Cyclone Seroja, causing significant damage and causing widespread power outages.

In popular culture
Kalbarri was featured at the end of the 2005 film Wolf Creek when character Ben Mitchell (Nathan Phillips) was airlifted to hospital from Kalbarri Airport.

In the television series Prison Break, character James Whistler states he is originally from Kalbarri.

References

 
Coastal towns in Western Australia
Shire of Northampton